Creepschool is an animated series by Alphanim, the CINAR Corporation, Happy Life and France 3 about four kids who find themselves at a spooky boarding school. The basic concept was created by Torbjörn Jansson, which was then substantially re-worked and developed by the co-head-writers Kristina Mansfeld and Per Carlsson into the series it is today. They also wrote all the storylines. 26 episodes were produced. Creepschool has been compared to Gravedale High. Creepschool was the last television series produced by CINAR before it rebrands as Cookie Jar Group.

Plot
When four unsuspecting kids attend a remote, sinister-looking boarding school which is known as the Creepschool, they embark on an adventure into the fascinating, supernatural world. Imagine nightmares in your so called "Natural" life. Elliot, Josh, Janice and Victoria also share our everyday problems and… More! Who Says School Is Boring?

Characters
Mr. Malcolm
Miss Dorothy
Mr. Edgar
Gilbert
Tony
Gertrude
Brigita
Master
Elliot 
Janice
Josh
Victoria
Elsa
Elvira 
Jasper
Toby
Bob

Episodes

Broadcast history
The series used to air on the Canadian Teletoon. It currently airs in Portugal on RTP2, in Sweden on SVTB and in France on Gulli. It was previously broadcast on Cartoon Network (India) in English and other regional languages. It also airs on Cartoon Network (Pakistan). As of July 2017, the entire series is available on YouTube in English and Swedish.

References

External links

2000s French animated television series
2004 French television series debuts
2004 French television series endings
Canadian children's animated fantasy television series
Canadian children's animated horror television series
French children's animated fantasy television series
French children's animated horror television series
Swedish animated television series
2004 Canadian television series debuts
2004 Canadian television series endings
Television series by Cookie Jar Entertainment
Television series by DHX Media
2000s Canadian animated television series
Gaumont Animation
Teletoon original programming
Animated television series about children